Kirill Polkhovskiy (born 9 January 2002) is a Belarusian professional footballer.

Honours
Dinamo Brest
Belarusian Premier League champion: 2019

References

External links 
 
 Profile at Dinamo Brest website
 

2002 births
Living people
Belarusian footballers
Association football forwards
FC Dynamo Brest players
FC Volna Pinsk players